Fluvanna Correctional Center for Women is a prison operated by the Virginia Department of Corrections. The security level 3 facility housed 1,199 female inmates as of June 2008, including formerly housing the women's death row for the Commonwealth of Virginia.

History

Fluvanna County became a candidate for a new women's prison after the Board of Supervisors of Bedford County rejected a 1992 proposal by the Virginia Department of Corrections for a new 600-inmate facility in Lynchburg, Virginia that would have created between 250 and 300 jobs.

Completed at a cost of $53.1 million, the correctional center was opened in April 1998, starting with about 800 prisoners. The facility is the second in the state dedicated to housing only female inmates, after the Virginia Correctional Center for Women in Goochland. The new prison was designed to accommodate 1,200 inmates and incorporated a  medical facility on site to minimize the risk of escape. The perimeter was secured by electronic fences and patrols.

In December 1998, warden Patti Leigh Huffman refused to enforce a state order that banned cosmetics from the female prison population. The Virginia Department of Corrections was concerned about drugs being smuggled in makeup containers, but the prison was already equipped for detection of such contraband. Huffman stated, "If a woman wants to use cosmetics to make her feel better, then that's important.... Self-esteem is a core factor of every program at Fluvanna."

Investigations
In 1999, the American Civil Liberties Union investigated growing reports of sexual misconduct by the male prison staff upon the inmates. The corrections department stated that it would not consider any relationship between guards and inmates consensual under any circumstances. In June 2009, state senator Frank Ruff requested that the department investigate allegations that the correctional center denied access to religious services and profiled lesbian inmates for segregation.

Death Row
Though the facility housed the death row for Virginia's female inmates prior to its abolition in 2021, executions by lethal injection were conducted at Greensville Correctional Center near Jarratt, Virginia, located to the south of Richmond. Teresa Lewis, the only woman held in Fluvanna's death row, was executed on September 23, 2010.

Notable inmates

See also

Capital punishment in Virginia
List of Virginia state prisons

References

External links
Fluvanna Correctional Center for Women at the Virginia Department of Corrections
Fluvanna Correctional Center for Women: A model facility at AllBusiness.com

Government buildings completed in 1998
Capital punishment in Virginia
Buildings and structures in Fluvanna County, Virginia
Prisons in Virginia
Women's prisons in the United States
1998 establishments in Virginia
Women in Virginia